FEST is an annual film festival held in Belgrade, Serbia since 1971. The festival is usually held in the first quarter of the year.

It was the only film festival in socialist countries that attracted big Hollywood stars such as Jack Nicholson, Kirk Douglas, Robert De Niro, Dennis Hopper, Peter Fonda and famous directors like Miloš Forman, Francis Ford Coppola, Roman Polanski, Sam Peckinpah, Pier Paolo Pasolini etc.

The festival's significance declined in the 1990s, mostly due to the international embargo FR Yugoslavia was under at the time. In 1993 and 1994, it was not even held, and in 1997, it was interrupted in protest against police brutality taking place against student protesters.

However, FEST still attracts numerous movie buffs. In 2007, 98,191 tickets were sold for around 80 films.

In 2007 it was opened by actress Catherine Deneuve and in 2009 by actor Ralph Fiennes.

B2B Belgrade Industry Meetings 
Since 2006, B2B Belgrade Industry Meetings is established as a part of FEST. Program and business focus of B2B are cinematographies of the Europe out of Europe countries. B2B focuses on production, authors and films with the origin geographically in Europe, but still not enough intensely included in European integrative currents, also in countries outside Europe with strong European influence and heritage - Albania, Armenia, Azerbaijan, Belarus, Bosnia and Herzegovina, Croatia, Georgia, Israel, Kazakhstan, Kyrgyzstan, Macedonia, Moldova, Montenegro, Serbia, Russia, Tajikistan, Turkey, Turkmenistan, Ukraine and Uzbekistan.

B2B become a gathering place for directors, producers, financiers, exhibitors, distributors, representatives of ministries of culture and film centers from the above-mentioned countries, together with representatives of film funds and production companies from Western Europe. B2B will give the professionals - independent producers, fund representatives, distributors, representatives of the festivals, TV buyers - possibility to take deep insight in cinematography and production possibilities in these countries.

References

External links 
 

Film festivals in Serbia
Entertainment in Belgrade
Tourist attractions in Belgrade
1971 establishments in Yugoslavia
Film festivals established in 1971
Festivals in Yugoslavia